Marinobacter algicola is a Gram-negative, aerobic and moderately halophilic bactebacterium from the genus of Marinobacter which has been isolated from the dinoflagellate Gymnodinium catenatum in Scotland.

References

Further reading

External links
Type strain of Marinobacter algicola at BacDive -  the Bacterial Diversity Metadatabase

Alteromonadales
Bacteria described in 2006
Halophiles